The discography of contemporary Christian musician from Brandon Heath consist of seven studio albums, three extended plays (EPs), two independent albums (IAs), nine music videos and eighteen singles. After making a demo CD, Heath gained a fame in the Christian music industry when he independently released his debut album titled Early Stuff in 2004. On the same year he released his second album Soldier which was produced by Chris Davis. In 2005 another independent album was releases titled Don't Get Comfortable The EP.

In 2006 he released his first studio album titled Don't Get Comfortable following his three singles "Our God Reigns" which placed at No. 13 on US Christian, "I'm Not Who I Was" which became top No. 1 in three weeks and "Don't Get Comfortable" placed at No. 11 in US Christian Hit Billboard.

Heath's second studio album "What If We" released in 2008 and reached the top three in the Top US Christian Album and top seventy three in Billboard 200. The lead single "Give Me Your Eyes" became his second highest-peaking single on the US Christian which is reached in No. 1. In 2009 he released a second single on the same album titled "Wait and See" reached No. 4 in US and Canada. It followed the new single "Follow You" featuring Leeland reached No. 7. In 2010 he released his third and final single from the album What If We titled "Love Never Fails" peaking a position at No. 18 in US Christian Songs and Hot Canadian Contemporary Song.

Heath third studio album "Leaving Eden" was released on January 18, 2011. The first single "Your Love" was released in 2010 reached at No. 1 in six weeks on the US Christian which became his third highest-peaking single after the released of his "Give Me Your Eyes" and "I'm Not Who I Was". The second single "Leaving Eden" released on June 19, 2011.

Heath's fourth studio album, Blue Mountain, was released on October 9, 2012. It follows the first single from the album "Jesus in Disguise" together with the lyrics video on YouTube then later the music video. The single reached at No. 9 on Hot Christian Songs and No. 5 on the Billboard Christian songs chart.

In July 2022, achieved his fourth number one single, "See Me Through It" on both the Christian Airplay and Christian Adult Contemporary Airplay charts. It is his first number one for twelve years. The single is from his eighth album Enough Already.

Albums

Independent albums
2003: Early Stuff
2004: Soldier

Studio albums

Compilation albums
No Brandon Heath standard compilation albums have yet been released, only one box set as listed in the Box set section.

Box sets

Guest appearances 

{| class="wikitable"
|-
! style="width:3em;"| Year
! style="width:12em;"| Artist
! style="width:12em;"| Album
! style="width:20em;"| Song(s)
|-
| 2008
| Various
| Billy: The Early Years
| style="text-align:center;"| 
"Heavenly Day"
|-
| 2009
| Various
| Glory Revealed II
| style="text-align:center;"|
"What We Proclaim" (with Aaron Shust & Mike Donehey)
|-
| 2009
| Leeland
| Love Is on the Move
| style="text-align:center;"| 
"Follow You"
|-
| 2010
| Jars of Clay
| The Shelter
| style="text-align:center;"| 
"Small Rebellions"
"Shelter" (with Audrey Assad & tobyMac)
|-
| 2011
| Various
| Music Inspired by The Story
| style="text-align:center;"|
"Bend" (Joseph)
|-
| 2013
| Various
| Jesus, Firm Foundation: Hymns of Worshp
| style="text-align;center;"|
"It Is Well (Oh My Soul)"
|-
| 2014
| Lindsay McCaul
| One More Step| style="text-align;center;"|
"With the Brokenhearted"
|}

Extended plays

Singles

Videos

Music videos

Lyric videos

 Other appearances 

 Compilation albums (various artists) 

Soundtracks (various artists) 
2008: Billy: The Early Years soundtrack: "Heavenly Day"
2011: Courageous soundtrack: "Your Love"
2012: October Baby soundtrack: "Now More Than Ever"
2022: The Sound Of Violet'' soundtrack: "Anywhere But Here"

References 

Heath, Brandon
Christian music discographies